Radio Bar is a 1936 Argentine musical film drama  directed and written by Manuel Romero. It is a tango film.

Main cast
Gloria Guzmán
Olinda Bozán
Carmen Lamas
Alicia Barrié
Alberto Vila
Juan Carlos Thorry
Marcos Caplán
Susy Derqui
Violeta Desmond
Lydia Desmond
Benita Puértolas
José Ramírez
Héctor Quintanilla
Carlos Enríquez
Roberto Blanco
Juan Mangiante
Paquita León
Matilde Gómez
María Zubarrián

External links

1936 films
1930s Spanish-language films
Argentine black-and-white films
Tango films
Films directed by Manuel Romero
1930s musical drama films
1930s dance films
Argentine musical drama films
1936 drama films
1930s Argentine films